Eric Andrew Warfield (born March 3, 1976) is a former professional football player. He was drafted by the Chiefs in the 7th round of the 1998 NFL Draft. He played college football at Nebraska. Warfield also spent a portion of the 2006 offseason with the New England Patriots.

Professional career

Kansas City Chiefs
Warfield finished the 2004 NFL season with 45 tackles after three straight years of over 70.  He also intercepted four passes (one for a touchdown), and forced two fumbles in 2004.

In 2005, Warfield struggled with legal issues that threatened his NFL career.  On March 3, he was convicted of a third DUI charge and was sentenced to 10 days in jail and 80 days of house arrest.  In the wake of this incident, the NFL suspended Warfield for the first four games of the 2005 season.

New England Patriots
On April 3, 2006, Warfield was signed by the New England Patriots but was released shortly after training camp, never playing in a regular season game for the team.

External links
New England Patriots bio

References

1976 births
Living people
Sportspeople from Vicksburg, Mississippi
American football cornerbacks
Nebraska Cornhuskers football players
Kansas City Chiefs players
New England Patriots players